The Malecon Center is a complex of skyscrapers in Santo Domingo, Dominican Republic. The complex was built in 2003. The complex is divided into four towers: Malecon 1, Malecon 2, Malecon 3 and Hilton Santo Domingo. Each Malecon tower has 31 floors and the Hilton Santo Domingo has 21 floors, for a total of 114 floors in the complex. The buildings were designed by the architecture firm Rodríguez Sandoval.

The three Malecon towers, which were completed in 2003, are for residential use. The fourth tower in the complex, Hilton Santo Domingo, is a hotel that was completed in 2004. Also included in the complex are a mall, movie theater and a casino. The complex is located near the shore and overlooks the Caribbean Sea.

References 

Skyscrapers in the Dominican Republic
Buildings and structures completed in 2003
Buildings and structures in Santo Domingo
Residential skyscrapers
Skyscraper hotels
Residential buildings in the Dominican Republic
Hotels in the Dominican Republic